The 2005–06 Munster Rugby season was Munster's fifth season competing in the Celtic League, alongside which they also competed in the Heineken Cup. It was Declan Kidney's first season as head coach, in his second spell at the province.

2005–06 squad

Pre-season

2005–06 Celtic League

2005–06 Heineken Cup

Pool 1

Note: Munster took first place over Sale Sharks on competition points in head-to-head matches, 5–4.

Quarter-final

Semi-final

Final

References

External links
2005–06 Munster Rugby season official site 

2005–06
2005–06 in Irish rugby union